Latvia is a net energy importer. Primary energy use in Latvia was 49 TWh, or 22 TWh per million persons in 2009. In 2018, electricity consumption per capita was 3731 kWh.

Overview

Renewable energy sources 

Almost half of the electricity used in the country is provided by renewable energy sources. The main renewable resource is hydroelectric power. Latvia has laws that regulate the building of power plants and plans to sell electricity at higher prices. This is a stimulus for investment, especially taking into consideration the fact that Latvia cannot offer big subsidies in order to attract investment. A production quota is approved for each renewable energy source every year.

Business 
Natural gas companies include Latvijas Gāze. Latvia has gas storage with a capacity of 3.2 billion cubic meters.

See also

References